

Protozoans

Diatoms

Plants

Conifers

Angiosperms

Fungi

Arthropoda

Arachnids

Insects

Xiphosurans
 Fossils of Lunataspis, the earliest known xiphosuran, are discovered in Canada. It was not given a formal description until 2008, however.

Plesiosaurs

New taxa

Archosauromorphs

Newly named Non-Avian dinosaurs
Data courtesy of George Olshevsky's dinosaur genera list.

Newly named birds

Newly named pterosaurs

Synapsids

Non-mammalian

Footnotes

Complete author list
As science becomes more collaborative, papers with large numbers of authors are becoming more common. To prevent the deformation of the tables, these footnotes list the contributors to papers that erect new genera and have many authors.

References

 
2000s in paleontology
Paleontology